Kate Zilpah Manicom (11 March 1893 – 27 October 1937) was a British suffragette and trade unionist.

Life
Manicom was born on 11 March 1893 in the St Pancras area of London, Manicom attended Southfields Girls' School.  From 1911, she was active in the women's suffrage movement.  She was associated with Sylvia Pankhurst, and worked with the East London Federation of Suffragettes.  She also joined the Labour Party and the Workers' Union, for which she worked as an organiser from 1917.  In this position, she recruited women workers across the country, and played a key role in the strike of Pearl Assurance workers.

The Representation of the People Act 1918 only enfranchised women over thirty, and Manicom was a leading campaigner to extend the franchise to women on the same basis as which it applied to men.  When the Workers' Union became part of the Transport and General Workers' Union (TGWU), she became a London District Organiser.  She also served on the Trades Union Congress Women's Advisory Committee and the Standing Joint Committee of Industrial Women's Organisations.  She also attended the 1921 International Congress of Working Women, and was a delegate to the International Labour Organization.

From 1924, Manicom worked as a postal clerk, although she remained active in the trade union movement. She died on 27 October 1937.

References

1893 births
1937 deaths
English suffragists
English trade unionists
People from St Pancras, London
English women trade unionists